Peter R. Vroon (January 6, 1917 – April 8, 1997) was a Republican member of the Pennsylvania House of Representatives. In 1988, Vroon ran for the State Senate from the 19th district, but was defeated in the Republican primary by County Commissioner Earl Baker.

He is the father of Donald Vroon, music critic and the editor of American Record Guide.

References

Republican Party members of the Pennsylvania House of Representatives
1997 deaths
1917 births
20th-century American politicians